Sozhasingarayer Robinson , also widely known as simply  S. Robinson  (born 23 June 1980 in Pondicherry, India) is a professional Indian basketball player.  He currently plays for the Tamil Nadu Basketball Team which competes in the India National Cup.

Career overview
Sozhasingarayer Robinson, born in Pondicherry,  grew up in Gujarat, India. A standout athlete in India, Robinson started to gain international media attention when he led India with 36 points to a surprise victory at the 2004 FIBA Asia Stanković Cup against South Korea, a regular competitor for the title at international tournaments in Asia.

For unknown reasons, he did not take the offer to play professionally in New Zealand in 2006, following extraordinary performances against the Tall Blacks. In that same year he was banned from representing his state's basketball team for missing its training camp. Robinson is known as being extremely outspoken as he severely criticized the lack of support for India's national basketball team from which he retired in 2006  only to try a comeback a little later. Robinson is one of the most well known figures in Indian basketball. Altogether, he played professional in basketball for the following teams:
 2003-04 Negar sang Sharekord 
 2004 Indian Overseas Bank Chennai 
 2004 Farsh Mashad 
 2005 Tamil Nadu 
 2005-06 Indian Overseas Bank Chennai 
 2006 offer sheet Auckland Stars , never played
 2010 Indian Army

Achievements
 2001, 2005-06 India national basketball team
 2010:  Ramu Memorial Basketball Tournament (RMBT) MVP

References

1980 births
Living people
Centers (basketball)
Indian men's basketball players
People from Gujarat
People from Pondicherry
Power forwards (basketball)
Young Cagers players
Sportspeople from Puducherry